List of C-47 Skytrain operators includes the country, military service, known squadrons, and related data. The Skytrain or Dakota is a military transport that was developed from the Douglas DC-3 airliner. The C-47 has served with over 90 countries outside of the United States:

Operators

Current operators

Bolivia
 Bolivian Air Force

Colombia

 Colombian Air Force

El Salvador
 Salvadoran Air Force

Guatemala
 Guatemalan Air Force

Malawi
 Malawi Air Force

Mali
Mali Air Force

Mauritania
 Mauritania Islamic Air Force - started operating one C-47 donated by France in 1960. Five additional aircraft were bought from France in the first half of the 1960s. Currently operates one Basler BT-67.

South Africa
 South African Air Force
 35 Squadron SAAF: Still in use, flying the Turbo Dakota

Thailand
 Royal Thai Air Force

United States
 United States Air Force

Former operators

Argentina

 Argentine Air Force - 55 (DC-3 and C-47)
 Argentine Naval Aviation - 13 (4 DC-3, 9 C-47) ex US

Australia

 Royal Australian Air Force
The RAAF impressed civil DC-3s in September 1939 at the outbreak of World War II. The first C-47s were delivered in 1942 under Lend-Lease and the first built specifically for the RAAF entered service in February 1943. RAAF had received 124 by 1945 which were used during World War II, the Korean War the Malayan Emergency and in Occupied Japan. Most were transferred to civilian government agencies in Australia and New Guinea or sold to airlines in the 1960s. 7 were transferred to Papua New Guinea Defence Force in 1973. A handful survived in RAAF service into the 1990s with the last two (A65-94 and A65-95) being retired from the Aircraft Research and Development Unit in March 1999. These two are now operated by the Historical Aircraft Restoration Society.
 Royal Australian Navy
Four ex-RAAF aircraft were transferred to the RAN post-war. 
 No. 723 Squadron RAN
 No. 724 Squadron RAN
 No. 725 Squadron RAN
 No. 851 Squadron RAN

Bangladesh
 Bangladesh Air Force - all retired.

Belgium
 Belgian Air Force

Brazil

 Brazilian Air Force
 Real Transportes Aéreos

Cambodia
 Royal Cambodian Air Force
Received ex-RAAF C-47s as foreign aid.

Canada

 Buffalo Airways
 Canadian Coast Guard - operated by Transport Canada
 Canadian Forces
 Environment Canada (ex-CAF)
 Royal Canadian Air Force  Last served with 402 Squadron in Winnipeg and was retired in 1988.
 103 Search and Rescue Squadron
 Royal Canadian Navy
 VU-32 Squadron

Chad
 Chadian Air Force

Czechoslovakia
 Czechoslovakian Air Force operated C-47s and Soviet-built Li-2.

Denmark
 Royal Danish Air Force

Ethiopia
 Ethiopian Air Force

Finland
The Finnish Air Force operated nine from 1960 to 1984. One was involved in the Finnish Air Force's deadliest crash on 3 October 1978, when the aircraft crashed soon after takeoff, killing all 15 aboard.

France
 The French Air Force operated Skytrains from September 1944 on, when Lend-Lease C-47Bs were delivered to the Groupe de Transport 1/15. After the war, they were the only transport aircraft in large numbers with the Junkers 52 until the late 1950s.
 The French Navy used an example in the First Indochina War as a transport aircraft. After some were used as training aircraft by the squadron 56S.

Germany
 20 used by the post-war West German Luftwaffe

Greece
The Hellenic Air Force's received a total of 78 aircraft, in several batches, with 26 ex-RAF Dakota IVs received from 1947 to 1949, 16 ex-USAAF C-47s in 1947–48, 30 C-47s supplied from the US under the Mutual Assistance Program and six aircraft from Olympic Airways in 1963. They equipped the 355th and 356th Transport Squadrons. These were widely used in the Greek Civil War (1946–49) in transport and bombing roles. The 13th Transport Flight used C-47s in the Korean War, earning a U.S. Presidential Citation. The 356th sSquadron converted to the Lockheed C-130 Hercules in 1975, but 26 C-47s remained operational with 355 Squadron at the beginning of the 1980s, with aircraft gradually being phased out over time, with four aircraft remaining operational in 2000 and the last aircraft, a veteran of the Korean War, grounded in 2008.

Haiti
Haiti Air Corps

Honduras

Hungary
 Hungarian Air Force operated Soviet-built Li-2s.

India
 Indian Air Force

Indonesia
Indonesian Army (TNI-AD)
Indonesian Navy (TNI-AL)
Indonesian Air Force (TNI-AU)
C-47 Dakota RI-001 Seulawah was bought by the Acehnese in 1948 and flown between Java and Sumatra. After the war of independence in 1949 some C-47s were transferred from the Royal Netherlands East Indies Air Force and later ex-RAAF C-47s were received as foreign aid. During the Indonesian invasion of East Timor two C-47s were converted to Gunships with three AN/M3 Browning machine guns.

Iran
Imperial Iranian Air Force

The IIAF acquired 22 Douglas C-47 Skytrains in 1949.

Israel

 Israeli Air Force

Italy
 Italian Air Force
 Operated 19 C-47s and 8 C-53 as staff transports and ECM aircraft into the mid-1980s.

Japan

On February 24, 1938, a subsidiary of Nakajima (Mitsui) purchased production rights and technical data to the DC-3 for $90,000. The aircraft was extensively redesigned to use Japanese raw materials and the Pratt & Whitney Twin Wasp engines were replaced with Mitsubishi Kinsei 43 radial engines. Production initially lagged behind expectations until 1942. Japanese DC-3s were given the Navy designation L2D-2 (L-transport, 2-second Douglas type, D-Douglas, 2-second sub-type). L2D1 was used for imported DC-3s. The Japanese built eight subtypes in two basic configurations, as passenger transport and as cargo planes. In two years Nakajima built 71 L2D-2s before handing production over to Showa, which built 416, including 75 freighters equipped with a large side door.

Laos
 Royal Lao Air Force
Received ex-RAAF C-47s as foreign aid.

Libya
Royal Libyan Air Force - operated several C-47Bs donated in the 1960s by the United States.

Morocco
Royal Moroccan Air Force - received a few DC-3s in 1961, handed over by Royal Air Maroc. As of 1962, 10 C-47s were on strength. Four additional aircraft were delivered by the United States around 1964. At least 10 C-47s were still operational as of 1975. However, they have been retired before 1985.

Mozambique
LAM Mozambique Airlines and its predecessor Direcção de Exploração de Transportes Aéreos

Netherlands
 Royal Netherlands Air Force
 Dutch Naval Aviation Service
 Royal Netherlands East Indies Air Force – Postwar

New Zealand

 Royal New Zealand Air Force: Operated C-47s between 1942 and 1977.
 No. 40 Squadron RNZAF
 No. 41 Squadron RNZAF
 No. 42 Squadron RNZAF

Niger
Niger Air Force
Four C-47s received in the 1960s.

North Yemen
Yemen Arab Republic Air Force

Norway

Royal Norwegian Air Force

Pakistan
 Pakistan Air Force
 Received eight C-47 Dakota cargo planes which it used to transport supplies to soldiers fighting in the 1947 War in Kashmir against India.

Papua New Guinea
 Papua New Guinea Defence Force Air Operations Element
 A total of seven ex-Royal Australian Air Force C-47s were transferred to the PNGDF following independence in 1973.

Paraguay

 Paraguayan Air Force (FAP)
 Transporte Aéreo Militar (TAM): Between 1953 and 1998, TAM operated 33 Douglas C-47/DC-3s. The first five aircraft were purchased in the U.S. The U.S. government, through MAP donated 21 C-47s between 1962 and 1973. Chile donated 2 C-47s in 1981 and Brazil 2 C-47 in 1984.
 Paraguayan Naval Aviation (ANP)
 Servicio Aero Naval (SAN): In 1981, the Argentinian Naval Aviation donated one C-47 to its Paraguayan counterpart.
 Líneas Aéreas Paraguayas (LAP): This airline used one C-47 borrowed from TAM between 1970 and 1974.

Philippines

 Philippine Air Force
President Magsaysay of the Philippines was killed in the crash of a Philippine Air Force C-47 in 1957.
Some were ex-RAAF C-47s received as foreign aid.

Poland
 Polish Air Force operated up to 17 C-47As, known as C-47 Dakota. Several were acquired in 1944–1945 from the USSR, and most bought in 1946 from US stocks. They were used until early 1960, along with Soviet-built Li-2s.
LOT Polish Airlines operated nine C-47s, also known as Dakota, bought in 1946 from US stocks and used as passenger airliners (registration numbers SP-LCA to LCI). Several ex-Air Force aircraft were used as well. They were used until 1959, at least three crashed.

Portugal

Section source: Geocities C-47
The first Portuguese Dakota (where it was only known as the Dakota) was interned in 1944 and it remained the sole example in Portuguese service transporting military VIPs until September 1958 when additional Dakotas came from the United States. Portuguese Dakotas were used for a wide variety of roles including one aircraft (6155) used as a bomber during the Portuguese Colonial War, and two converted to spray pesticides. The Dakota was retired in 1976. One (6157) was preserved for the Museu do Ar (Air Museum). 
Portuguese Air Force
 81 Squadron – Transport mission
 E.I.C.P.A.C. – Esquadra de Instrução Complementar de Pilotagem de Aviões Pesados (Heavy Transport Training Squadron). Formed at B.A.2 Ota in 1960 with C-47s.
 E.L.T.S. – Esquadrilha de Ligação de Transporte Sanitário (Sanitary Transport Squadron). Also based at Lisbon, had aircraft equipped for VIP and medical transport.
 101 Squadron – Formed at B.A.10 – Beira (Moçambique) on February 5, 1962 with C-47s. Later transferred to Lourenço Marques as Esquadra 801.
Aeronáutica Militar (Army Military Aviation)
 Esquadrilha Independente de Aviação de Caça-Secção de Transportes Aéreos (Fighter-Air Transport Section of Independent Aviation Squadron)

Rhodesia
 Rhodesian Air Force

Saudi Arabia
 Royal Saudi Air Force

Senegal
 Senegalese Air Force

Somalia
 Somali air corps – 3 in 1981, all withdrawn

South Africa
 South African Air Force
 44 Squadron SAAF: Employed in 1944 and 1945 to support operations in the Greek Civil War.

Southern Rhodesia
Southern Rhodesian Air Force

South Korea

Republic of Korea Air Force

South Yemen
People's Republic of Yemen Air Force - operated four C-47s left behind by the British at independence, in 1967.

Soviet Union
 Soviet Air Force: The Lisunov Li-2 was a license-built DC-3, produced in Russia. Some 6000 were built between 1939 and 1952. The Soviet Union also operated C-47s supplied under Lend-Lease during World War II.

Sudan
Sudanese Air Force: two C-47s delivered in the early 1960s.

Sweden

The Swedish Air Force started using C-47s soon after World War II for transport purposes. A few were converted to SIGINT platforms and eavesdropped on Soviet radio communications and radar stations in the 1950s. One such aircraft was shot down by Soviet fighters in international airspace over the Baltic Sea in 1952 with all of the crew killed.

Turkey
 Turkish Air Force
 Turkish Airlines

Uganda
 Uganda Air Force: received C-47s from Israel in the mid-1960s.

United Kingdom
 Royal Air Force: RAF Transport Command was supplied with over 1,900 Dakotas under Lend-Lease during World War II and the type was flown by at least 46 operational squadrons, plus numerous support units. The RAF flew 50 Dakota I (C-47), 9 Dakota II (C-53), 962 Dakota III (C-47A) and 896 Dakota IV (C-47B). RAF Dakotas were assigned to all theatres of operations. RAF Dakotas dropped paratroopers and equipment and towed gliders to the Normandy landings and Arnhem. Four squadrons of Dakota IVs took part in the Berlin Airlift in 1948/49. The Battle of Britain Memorial Flight operates a single Dakota.
 BOAC: 59 C-47s were supplied to BOAC to maintain international air links.

United States

 US Army Air Corps
 US Army Air Force
 US Air Force
 US Marine Corps
 US Navy
 US Coast Guard
 Air National Guard
 Federal Aviation Administration
 National Test Pilot School

Venezuela

Venezuelan Air Force

Republic of Vietnam
 Air Vietnam
 Republic of Vietnam Air Force

Yugoslavia

 SFR Yugoslav Air Force
41 were operated from 1946 until 1976. 20 were received through military aid in 1953–1954. Also operated Li-2 aircraft 
SUKL (Federal ATC Authority) used 1 aircraft for navid calibration until 1986. 
Yugoslav Airlines operated around 20 converted military Dakotas bought from Great Britain in 1947.

Zambia
Zambian Air Force: operated 4 C-47s starting in 1964.

Zimbabwe
Air Force of Zimbabwe

See also
List of Douglas DC-3 operators

References

Citations

Bibliography

Further reading 

Lists of military units and formations by aircraft
C-47 Skytrain
Operators